is a Japanese manga artist, born in Nanao in Ishikawa, Japan. She debuted with the manga Warera High School Hero, published in the 1991 Autumn issue of Ribon Bikkuri Daizoukan. Her best-known work is Akazukin Chacha (Red Riding Hood Chacha).

Works

References

1969 births
Living people
Manga artists from Ishikawa Prefecture
People from Nanao, Ishikawa